The 1986 St. Louis Cardinals season was the sixty-seventh season for the franchise was in the league, and the 27th and penultimate season in St. Louis. The team failed to improve on their previous output of 5–11, winning only four games. This was the fourth straight season in which the team did not reach the playoffs.

Personnel

Staff

Roster

Schedule

Standings

Awards and honors 
 Ron Wolfley, Pro Bowl selection

References 

1986
St. Louis Cardinals